Marrickville High School is a co-educational, public secondary school, located in Marrickville, an inner western suburb of Sydney, New South Wales, Australia. The school is administered by the New South Wales Department of Education.

Established in 1974, Marrickville High School has a non-selective enrolment policy and currently caters for approximately 360 students from years 7 to 12. Approximately 92% of its students coming from a non-English speaking background. In addition to the mainstream, the school also provides education for intellectually disabled students in their Support Unit and there is on-site Intensive English Centre.

Since 2002 the school has had a strong focus on Information Communication Technology and its implementation across the curriculum. Currently there is a strong focus on S.T.E.M. (Science, Technology, Engineering and Mathematics) activities. The school technology infrastructure is constantly updated to meet the needs of the students. Currently there is a strong focus on developing the performing arts including a school band and singing and drama performances.

History

Early history
In 1865, a block of land on Chapel Street in Marrickville was offered by Thomas Chalder to build Marrickville Public School. As the years progressed further extensions were made on the site: 22 November 1878 - saw Marrickville's old Council Chambers bought as an extension on the campus and converted into the teacher's residence, 1922 - Old Marrickville Town Hall located on Illawarra Road was bought as another extension and became Marrickville Junior Technical High School and on 1 January 1945 - the teacher's residence was turned into a girls' secondary school entitled Marrickville Girls' Intermediate High School.

Marrickville Girls' High School
In 1929, Marrickville Girls' Intermediate High School was established and it was until 1954 that it was renamed as Marrickville Girls' Junior High School and because of the large student population expanding, on 28 April 1969, the proposal to build a new secondary school on Sydenham Road was favoured. 1969 - Llewellyn, a two-storey Victorian estate on Petersham Road (which was owned by Benjamin Yabsley), was demolished to make way for the new school and in 1970 - Sydenham Villa which was on the location of Marrickville High's bottom field (built in 1880 and purchased by Thomas Daley in 1920, he renamed the estate to Standsure) was demolished. The students of Marrickville Girls' Junior High School were transferred to the new school in 1974.
 
On 7 October 1977, Marrickville Girls' High School was officially opened by the Governor of New South Wales, Sir Arthur Roden Cutler

Marrickville High School
In first term 1979, the school became coeducational because it could cater for more students and so give relief for Dulwich and Enmore High Schools. Marrickville Girls' High School and was renamed as Marrickville High School and it was only by 1984 that the student population completely became co-educational. School commenced in the 1st term of 1979 with 860 students and 64 staff members and due to the high migrant student population, there were several E.S.L and remedial reading classes.

In March 2001, an amalgamation of Marrickville High and Dulwich High on the Dulwich High campus was proposed by the New South Wales State Government and therefore meant the closure of Marrickville High School. This led to persistent campaigning from the local community, the teachers, students and their families, in addition to establishing the 'Save Our School' site. A thousand strong community meeting was held at Marrickville High School' hall to discuss the matter. It was in May 2002 that the Education Minister John Watkins stated that "Dulwich Hill and Marrickville high schools are to remain open, in the best interest of public education"

Principals

Marrickville Girls Junior High School

Marrickville Girls' High School

Marrickville High School

Sports 

Sport plays an important role at Marrickville High and it has always been competitive and ambitious in sporting matches. Sports can be played on school grounds or out of school venues, in compulsory PDHPE lessons or as an extra-curricular activity.

Weekly Grade Sports (Years 7 and 8) offered include:
Basketball
Cricket
Netball
Oz-tag
Soccer
Softball
Tennis
Volleyball

Weekly Integrated Sports (Years 9 and 10) available include: 
Tennis
Self-defence
Swimming
Ice-skating
Ten pin bowling
Hip-Hop dance
Capioera (a Brazilian Martial Art).
Rock climbing 

Annual Sports Gala Days are held, where years 7 and 8 students from local high schools use the sporting grounds at Marrickville High to compete against one another in games of basketball.

The school competes in the Sydney East Knockout Competition, through which girls may compete in Touch, OZ Tag, Netball, Basketball, Soccer and Volleyball, and boys in Rugby League, Touch, Soccer, Netball, Basketball, Softball and Volleyball, Table Tennis and Indoor Soccer.

Sporting houses

Marrickville High has a house system used for sporting carnivals, students are organised into teams based on their roll call class. Originally the houses were simply named Gold, Red and Blue but they have been renamed using the surnames of Australian sports people:
 Cathy Freeman, athlete
 Kieren Perkins, swimmer
 Michael Milton, Paralympian
Each year two sporting captains are chosen from the senior years to represent and lead their team. The school holds annual school carnivals in Swimming, Athletics and Cross-Country. Results from these Carnivals determine selection for school representative teams and students progress on to the Zone Carnival for further competition.

See also
List of Government schools in New South Wales

References

External links 

Public high schools in Sydney
Educational institutions established in 1974
1974 establishments in Australia
Marrickville, New South Wales